Stefano Sollima (born 4 May 1966) is an Italian director and screenwriter.

He is best known for his gritty crime-drama films such as ACAB – All Cops Are Bastards (2012), Suburra (2015), and Sicario: Day of the Soldado (2018), as well as the television series Romanzo criminale – La serie (2006–2008), Gomorrah (2014–2021) and ZeroZeroZero (2020–present).

Early life 
Born in Rome, Sollima is the son of Italian cult director and screenwriter Sergio Sollima. He started his career as a camera operator realizing numerous reports from war zones for several television networks, including CNN, CBS, and NBC.

Career 
In 1991, he made his debut as a director with the short film Thanks, presented at the Turin Film Festival. His 1993 short film Sotto le unghie was entered at the International Critics' Week section of the 1993 Cannes Film Festival. In 2003, Sollima wrote and directed black-and-white short film Zippo, which was presented in competition at the 2003 Venice Film Festival and at the Sitges Film Festival.

Sollima started working as a television director in 1998 with the soap opera Un posto al sole, before directing episodes of several television series like La squadra (2003–2007), Ho sposato un calciatore (2005), and Crimes (2006–2007). He made his breakout in 2008 thanks to the acclaimed Sky Cinema crime series Romanzo criminale – La serie, based on the 2002 book of the same name by judge Giancarlo De Cataldo. Sollima directed all the 22 episodes of the series, which ran for two seasons from 2008 to 2010, winning the Best Television Director award at the 2009 Flaiano International Prizes.

In 2012 Sollima made his feature film debut with the police brutality drama ACAB – All Cops Are Bastards, for which he received a David di Donatello and a Nastro d'Argento nomination for the Best New Director award. From 2014, he served as the main director of Sky Cinema's acclaimed crime-drama series Gomorrah, based on the 2006 non-fiction book of the same name by Roberto Saviano and its previous film adaptation. After directing various episodes of the first and the second season of the show, Sollima dropped out of the series in 2016 due to schedule conflicts with his other future projects. He then directed the ensemble crime-drama film Suburra (2015), co-produced by Netflix, which brought him another Nastro d'Argento nomination, this time for Best Director. In 2017 the movie was adapted by Netflix into a prequel television series, the first Italian Netflix Original Series.

In 2018, Sollima made his English language film debut with the action crime thriller Sicario: Day of the Soldado, described as an "anthological sequel" to Sicario (2015), starring Benicio del Toro and Josh Brolin.

The same year, he began shooting the internationally co-produced crime TV series ZeroZeroZero, which he also co-created, about global cocaine trade from South America to Europe. Based on Roberto Saviano's non-fiction book of the same name, the show stars Dane DeHaan, Gabriel Byrne and Andrea Riseborough.

Filmography

Short films

Feature films
 ACAB – All Cops Are Bastards (2012)
 Suburra (2015)
 Sicario: Day of the Soldado (2018)
 Without Remorse (2021)
 Adagio (2023)

Television

Music videos
 "Distratto" — Francesca Michielin (2012)

Awards and nominations

References

External links 

 

1966 births
Living people
Italian film directors
Italian television directors
Italian screenwriters
Italian male screenwriters
Film people from Rome